A city guard, city watch, town guard, or town watch, was a law enforcement and security formation found in many countries and historical periods, usually subordinate to the local municipal government. Historically, many cities had their own guard formations, which doubled as police and military forces in times of need.

United States
After 1830, with the Indian removal policy of the federal government giving white settlers a monopoly over the land east of the Mississippi, many states disbanded their unorganized militias in favor of volunteer militia units who frequently called themselves city or national guards.  These companies performed functions such as assisting local law enforcement, providing troops for ceremonies and parades or acting as a benevolent social club.  The groups of company size were usually uniformed and armed themselves as well as erecting armories through their own contributions. Volunteer units of sufficient size could elect their own officers and apply for a state charter under names that they themselves chose.

Companies

Boston City Guard
Cambridge City Guard
Chicago Light Guard 
 Detroit Light Guard
Hannibal Guards
 Montgomery Guards
Richardson Light Guard
Salem Light Guard
Swatara Guards
Wallace Guards
Wamesit Guard
Worcester City Guard

With the unification of laws and centralization of state power (such as the Municipal Police Act of 1844 in New York City), such formations became increasingly incorporated into state-run police forces.

The Militia Act of 1903 remade city guard forces by stipulating all organized militia companies were to be incorporated into the Army National Guard or Naval Militias.

See also
City guard (Poland)
Colombo Town Guard
First Troop Philadelphia City Cavalry
Militia
Municipal Guards
Shurta
Schutterij
Watchman (law enforcement)

Notes

 
Law enforcement units
Military history of the United States
Militia in the United States
et:Munitsipaalpolitsei
National Guard (United States)
sk:Obecná polícia
cs:Obecní policie
Obsolete occupations
de:Stadtpolizei
nl:Stadswacht
State defense forces of the United States
pl:Straż miejska
sv:Tornvakt